Here is a list of aircraft used by the British Royal Air Force (RAF), Royal Navy Fleet Air Arm (FAA), Army Air Corps (AAC) and British Overseas Airways Corporation (BOAC) during the Second World War.

Fighters and fighter-bombers 

Bell Airacobra (RAF), one example for carrier landing by RN.
Blackburn Roc (FAA) naval turret fighter retired from combat by 1941
Blackburn Skua (FAA) naval fighter/dive bomber retired from combat 1941
Boulton Paul Defiant (RAF) turret fighter/night fighter until withdrawn in 1942-1943 from operational roles
Brewster Buffalo (RAF)
Bristol Beaufighter (RAF) strike fighter
Bristol Blenheim (RAF) long range fighter and night fighter
Curtiss Mohawk (RAF)
Curtiss Kittyhawk and Tomahawk (RAF)
de Havilland Mosquito (RAF) night fighter & fighter-bomber
de Havilland Vampire (RAF) prototype jet fighter
Douglas Havoc (RAF) night fighter
Fairey Fulmar (FAA) fleet fighter 
Fairey Firefly (FAA) fleet fighter
Gloster Gladiator (RAF, FAA)
Gloster Meteor (RAF) jet fighter
Gloster Sea Gladiator (FAA)
Grumman Martlet/Wildcat (FAA)
Grumman Hellcat (FAA)
Hawker Hurricane (RAF, FAA)
Hawker Sea Hurricane (FAA)
Hawker Tempest (RAF)
Hawker Typhoon  (RAF)
North American Mustang (RAF)
Republic Thunderbolt (RAF)
Supermarine Spitfire (RAF & FAA)
Supermarine Seafire (FAA)
Vought Corsair (FAA)
Westland Whirlwind (RAF) twin engine fighter
Westland Welkin (RAF) high altitude fighter

Torpedo bombers, dive bombers and army cooperation

Avro Rota (RAF) Army cooperation autogyro
Blackburn Skua (FAA) naval fighter/dive bomber
Fairey Albacore (RAF, FAA) torpedo/dive bomber
Fairey Barracuda (FAA) torpedo/dive bomber
Fairey Swordfish (FAA) torpedo bomber
Grumman Tarpon/Avenger (FAA) torpedo bomber
Hawker Audax (RAF) Army cooperation biplane
Hawker Hardy (RAF) General purpose biplane
Hawker Hector (RAF) Army cooperation biplane
Hawker Hind (RAF) light bomber
North American Mustang (RAF) tactical reconnaissance and ground-attack under RAF Army Cooperation Command
Vickers Vildebeest (RAF) torpedo bomber, retired 1942
Westland Lysander (RAF) Army cooperation
Westland Wapiti  (RAF) general purpose biplane used in India until 1940

Level bombers 

Armstrong Whitworth Albemarle (RAF)
Armstrong Whitworth Whitley (RAF)
Avro Manchester (RAF)
Avro Lancaster (RAF)
Avro Lincoln (RAF)
Boeing Fortress (RAF)
Boulton Paul Overstrand (RAF) withdrawn from operational service in late 1939
Bristol Beaufort (RAF, FAA)
Bristol Blenheim/Bisley (RAF)
Bristol Bombay (RAF) bomber-transport
Douglas Boston (RAF)
Fairey Battle (RAF)
Fairey Gordon (RAF)
Handley Page Halifax (RAF)
Handley Page Hampden/Hereford (RAF)
Lockheed Hudson (RAF)
Lockheed Ventura (RAF)
Martin Maryland (RAF, FAA)
Martin Marauder (RAF)
Martin Baltimore (RAF, FAA)
North American Mitchell (RAF, FAA)
Short Stirling (RAF)
Vickers Valentia (RAF) bomber-transport
Vickers Vincent (RAF) general purpose
Vickers Warwick (RAF) prototypes only, most used for maritime reconnaissance and air-sea rescue
Vickers Wellesley (RAF)
Vickers Wellington (RAF)

Maritime patrol and coastal reconnaissance 

Armstrong Whitworth Whitley (RAF)
Avro Anson (RAF, FAA)
Boeing Fortress (RAF)
Blackburn Botha (RAF)
Bristol Beaufort (RAF, FAA)
Consolidated Catalina (RAF)
Consolidated Liberator  (RAF)
Fairey Seal (RAF, FAA) obsolete by 1943
Fairey Seafox (FAA) floatplane 
Fokker T.VIII (RAF) 1940, ex-Dutch floatplane 
Handley Page Hampden (RAF)
Lockheed Hudson (RAF)
Lockheed Ventura (RAF)
Martin Maryland (RAF)
Saro London (RAF) retired 1941
Saro Lerwick (RAF) retired 1942
Short Empire (RAF) two aircraft
Short Seaford (RAF) 1945, after VE Day
Short Singapore (RAF) retired 1941
Short Sunderland (RAF)
Supermarine Walrus (FAA, RAF) for air-sea rescue
Supermarine Sea Otter (RAF and FAA) air-sea rescue
Supermarine Stranraer (RAF) retired 1942
Vickers Warwick (RAF)
Vickers Wellington (RAF)
Vought Kingfisher (FAA)
Westland Lysander (RAF)

Photo reconnaissance 

Bristol Blenheim (RAF)
de Havilland Mosquito (RAF)
Lockheed Hudson (RAF)
North American Mustang (RAF)
Supermarine Spitfire (RAF)

Trainers and target tugs 

Airspeed Oxford (RAF) bomber trainer 
Avro 626 (RAF)
Avro Anson (RAF, FAA) multi-engine navigation and bomber crew trainer
Avro Tutor (RAF, FAA)
Blackburn B-2 (RAF) to 1942, most used by civilian training schools
Blackburn Botha (RAF) RAF target tug, retired 1944
Blackburn Shark (FAA) after withdrawn from use as torpedo bomber
Boulton Paul Defiant (RAF) gunnery trainer from 1942 to 1945
Boulton Paul Overstrand (RAF) obsolete bomber used as gunnery trainer to 1941
Cierva C.30 (RAF) Army cooperation training
Curtiss Cleveland (RAF) ground instructional training
de Havilland Tiger Moth (RAF, FAA) primary trainer
de Havilland Dominie (RAF) radio trainer
de Havilland Don (RAF) ground instructional training
Fairey III.F (FAA) obsolete bomber used as target tug until 1941
Fairey Gordon (RAF) obsolete bomber used as trainer and target tug 
Fairey Seal (RAF) obsolete bomber used as trainer and target tug until 1942
General Aircraft Cygnet (RAF) tricycle undercarriage trainer 
General Aircraft Owlet (RAF) tricycle undercarriage trainer
Handley Page Heyford (RAF) obsolete bomber used as trainer to 1941
Hawker Demon (RAF) obsolete fighter used as trainer
Hawker Hart (RAF) obsolete bomber used as trainer and target tug
Hawker Henley (RAF) target tug
Hawker Osprey (FAA) obsolete fighter used as trainer
Miles Magister (RAF) primary trainer 
Miles Martinet (RAF)
Miles Master (RAF) target tug
North American Harvard  (RAF, FAA) advanced pilot trainer
Percival Proctor (RAF, FAA) radio trainer 
Sikorsky Hoverfly (RAF) helicopter
Vickers Wellington (RAF) bomber trainer
Westland Lysander (RAF) target tug
Westland Wallace (RAF) obsolete bomber used as target tug after withdrawn from general use, to 1943

Transport and communications

Experimental and other

Baynes Bat (RAF) tailless tank carrying glider
Boulton Paul P.92 (RAF) turret fighter half scale prototype
Bristol Type 138 (RAF) high-altitude research
Folland Fo.108 engine testbed (operated by engine manufacturers)
General Aircraft GAL.56 (RAF) tailless swept wing glider
Gloster E.28/39 (RAF) jet propelled aircraft
Gloster Gauntlet (RAF) obsolete fighter used for meteorological flights
Handley Page Manx (RAF) flying wing
Hillson Bi-mono (RAF) slip wing testbed
Miles M.3E Gillette Falcon (RAF) high speed airfoil testing
Miles M.30 (RAF) blended-wing testbed
Miles M.35 Libellula (RAF) canard testbed
Miles M.39B Libellula (RAF) canard testbed
Saro Shrimp half scale development testbed for R.5/39 Sunderland replacement
Vickers Type 470 and Type 486 Wellington (RAF) flying test beds for Whittle turbojet

Prototypes & trials
Airspeed Cambridge (RAF) trainer
Airspeed Fleet Shadower (RAF) maritime patrol
Blackburn B-20 (RAF) maritime patrol seaplane
Blackburn Firebrand (FAA) torpedo fighter

Brewster Buccaneer (FAA) dive bomber rejected for service after trials
Bristol Brigand (RAF) bomber 
Bristol Buckingham (RAF) bomber 
Curtiss Cleveland (RAF) dive-bomber diverted from French but not used
Curtiss Helldiver (FAA) dive bomber rejected for service after trials
de Havilland Hornet (RAF) twin engine fighter
de Havilland Sea Hornet (FAA) twin engine fighter
de Havilland Vampire (RAF) jet fighter prototype
Fairey Spearfish (FAA) torpedo/dive bomber
General Aircraft Fleet Shadower (RAF) maritime patrol

General Aircraft GAL.47 (RAF) Army cooperation
General Aircraft GAL.55 (RAF) training glider
Gloster F.9/37 (RAF) heavy fighter
Hafner Rotabuggy (RAF) developed as a way of air-dropping vehicles
Hawker Hotspur (RAF) turret fighter
Hawker Fury (monoplane) (RAF) fighter
Hawker Tornado (RAF) fighter
Lockheed Lightning (RAF) evaluation only before order cancelled
Martin-Baker MB 2 (RAF) fighter
Martin-Baker MB 3 (RAF) fighter
Martin-Baker MB 5 (RAF) fighter
Martin Mariner (RAF) tested October–December 1943, then rejected
Miles M.18 (RAF) trainer
Miles M.20 (RAF) fighter 
Reid and Sigrist R.S.3 Desford  (RAF) rejected trainer
Supermarine B.12/36 (Type 317)
Supermarine Type 322  (FAA) torpedo/dive bomber
Supermarine Spiteful (RAF) fighter 
Vickers Type 432  (RAF) high-altitude fighter
Vickers Windsor (RAF) bomber
Vought Chesapeake (FAA) dive bomber  diverted from French but not used
Vultee Vengeance (RAF) dive bomber rejected for service after trials

Gliders 

Airspeed Horsa (RAF, Army Air Corps)
General Aircraft Hamilcar (RAF, Army Air Corps)
General Aircraft Hotspur (RAF, Army Air Corps) training glider
Slingsby Hengist (RAF)
Waco Hadrian (RAF, Army Air Corps)

See also
List of aircraft of the Royal Air Force
List of aircraft of the Fleet Air Arm
List of Fleet Air Arm aircraft in World War II
List of aircraft of World War II

References

Notes

Citations

Bibliography
Owen Thetford: Aircraft of the Royal Air Force since 1918 6th edition. Putnam & Co., London 1976, .

World War II aircraft
Aircraft
World War II aircraft
 
United Kingdom

de:Britische Flugzeuge im Zweiten Weltkrieg